Gary Dauberman is an American screenwriter and director. He is known for writing The Conjuring Universe horror films Annabelle (2014), Annabelle: Creation (2017), The Nun (2018), and Annabelle Comes Home (2019). He made his directorial debut with the latter film. Dauberman also co-wrote the supernatural horror film It (2017), and wrote its follow-up It Chapter Two (2019), which are based on the novel of the same name.

Personal life
Dauberman grew up in Glen Mills, Pennsylvania and graduated from Penncrest High School in 1995. He attended Delaware County Community College for two years, where he majored in communications, before transferring to Temple University, where he graduated with a degree in Film and Media Studies in 2001.

Filmography

Film

Producer
 The Curse of La Llorona (2019)

Executive Producer
 The Nun 2 (2023)

Television

References

External links
 

Living people
American male screenwriters
Temple University alumni
American Christians
Year of birth missing (living people)
Horror film directors